Attorney General Power may refer to:

Bill Power (Australian politician) (1893–1974), Attorney-General of Queensland
Francis Isidore Power (1852–1912), Attorney-General of Queensland
Frederick A. Powers (1855–1923), Attorney General of Maine

See also
General Power (disambiguation)